The Meinong Folk Village (WG: Meinung Folk Village) is a cultural center in Meinong District, Kaohsiung, Taiwan about Hakka people.

History
The area was founded by Tsing Chi-hua to preserve the traditional folk crafts of Meinong.

Exhibitions
The center exhibits the preserved Hakka cultures and local industries as well as the cultures and geography of Meinong.

Facilities
The center includes shops and Hakka restaurant.

See also
 List of tourist attractions in Taiwan

References

Cultural centers in Kaohsiung